Nelson Lakes National Park is in the South Island of New Zealand, at the northern end of the Southern Alps. It was formed after the passing of the National Parks Act in 1952. It was created in 1956 (one of four created in the 1950s). The park contains beech forests, multiple lakes, snow-covered mountains and valleys created by glaciers during the ice ages.

Geography 
The park is centered at two large lakes, Rotoiti and Rotoroa. The park also includes the surrounding valleys (including Travers, Sabine, D'Urville and the upper reaches of the Matakitaki).

Mountain ranges include the Ella Range (Mount Magadalene (2187m) and Mount Ella (2253m)), Mahanga Range, Spencer Mountains, Travers Range (which includes Mount Hopeless (2278m), Angelus Peak (2075m) and Mount Robert (1411m)) and the Saint Arnaud Range (including Mount McKay (2300m), the Camel (1889m) and Mount McRae (1878m)).

To the west of the park lies the Victoria Forest Park and to the south lies the Lewis Pass Scenic Reserve and the St James Conservation Area. Northeast of the park is the Mount Richmond Forest Park.

The park is a popular area for camping, tramping and fishing. In 1959, The first park ranger was appointed in 1959. George Lyon, in this role, spent much of the 1960s building huts and making improvements to the tracks.

The park is administered by the Department of Conservation who operate a visitors centre in Saint Arnaud that provides up to date and reliable information on all aspects of the National Park.

Access to the park

A secondary access point is at Lake Rotoroa, turning off  at Gowanbridge. Shuttle services operate between St Arnaud, Nelson, Blenheim and Picton.

Activities

Camping 
The main campgrounds are on the shores of Lake Rotoiti; there is a smaller campground at Lake Rotoroa.

Tramping 
There is a network of tramping tracks throughout the park. Tracks range from short nature walks at Lake Rotoiti and Lake Rotorua, to multi-day backcountry tramps. Day tramps include the Lake Rotoiti circuit, St. Arnaud Range and Mt. Robert. The most popular long-distance tramping routes are the Travers-Sabine Circuit and other loops through Lake Angelus. The Te Araroa trail also passes through the park over Waiau Pass.

Skiing 
Rainbow Ski Area is located on the eastern side of the St Arnaud range, just outside the park on the slopes of Mount McRae.

The skifield on Mount Robert is no longer operational. (Mount Robert was named by Julius von Haast after his son). The ski field was first scouted for potential in 1929 and between 1933 and 1934 the Kea hut was built and the ski field established. In 1944, the Nelson Ski Club was established. In the early days, accessing the ski field was a challenge. One had to row across Lake Rotoiti and then hike to the top of Mount Robert while carrying all of one's ski gear. The ski field was closed in 2003. This was due to a lack of consistent snow and changes to when the school holidays fell during the year.

Other activities include mountaineering, boating, fishing and mountain biking.

Huts 

Nelson Lakes National Park contains 20 Department of Conservation huts, ranging in quality from 'basic hut/bivvy' to 'serviced hut'.

Mountain safety 
One of the most popular huts in the national park, Angelus Hut can be accessed via Robert Ridge amongst a number of routes. The Robert Ridge route is one of the most dangerous routes in bad weather. Between 2010 and 2019, search and rescue teams have had to rescue 45 trampers and there have been two fatalities. This represents an incidence of 1 search and rescue for every 700 trampers making the trip.

Snow and poor weather can occur at any time during the year and in combination with easy access to Robert Ridge from St Arnaud and the scenic location of Angelus Hut provide the so-called "perfect storm". Angelus Hut lies in an alpine environment at 1650m. During winter months, Lake Angelus (adjacent to Angelus Hut) is generally frozen over and each of the four routes to the hut are usually covered in snow and can be very icy.

The coroner has previously made recommendations that inexperienced trampers should avoid solo trips in alpine conditions or in winter, be aware of the weather forecast and to take an emergency shelter, navigation equipment and an emergency communication device.

Rotoiti Mainland Island

The Rotoiti Mainland Island consists of 5000 hectares of beech forest around Lake Rotoiti. There is a project which aims to eliminate introduced pests such as stoats, possums, wasps and rodents, and allow recovery of the forests and native wildlife populations.

The Rotoiti Nature Recovery Project has been a success in that it has reduced predator numbers on the eastern side of Lake Rotoiti. It is possible to see great spotted kiwi, robins, bellbirds, fantails, rock wrens, keas and paradise ducks as a result.

Fauna

Kererū 
The first record of kererū or New Zealand wood pigeon in the national park is from Charles Heaphy in 1846 who "obtained" six of them in a day and a half. There is a population of kererū at Lake Rotoroa which is considered stable.

Kākāriki 
The yellow-crowned parakeet were very common with "hundreds" near Lake Rotoroa around 1900. Although  numbers have declined and considered "rare" they can be spotted in many valleys of the national park. The red-crowned parakeet is "critically rare and possibly extinct in the national park. The orange-fronted parakeet (Kākāriki karaka) is considered extinct in the national park.

Kākāpō 
Kākāpō were common in the national park in the 1800s. Mary Thornton described "the kokapaw (kakapo)" as "good eating … all feathers really … you need at least a couple each for a good feed" in the 1890s. She then commented that "the kakapo seemed to vanish about the beginning of World War I".

Western weka 
The western weka (Gallirallus australis australis) is considered rare in the Nelson Lakes area. They were common when Charles Heaphy visited Lake Rotoroa in 1846. Julius von Haast wrote in 1861 that  "no other bird being as numerous as the weka which was everywhere in the grassy plains, forests, as well as near the summits of mountains amongst sub alpine vegetation". Weka were common throughout the Nelson Lakes before a sudden decline in their numbers between March and April 1909.

Cupola gecko 
The Cupola gecko is so rare that  only one live specimen had ever been found in 1968 near Cupola Hut and one further specimen had been found in 2007. Extensive searches in 2006 failed to uncover any further examples of the species. Three scientific trips in 2019 failed to find any evidence of the Cupola gecko. However In 2021, four examples were found in the Sabine valley demonstrating the species is not extinct.

The Cupola gecko is described as looking similar to other forest geckos, with grey-brown colouration and either darker or lighter W or V shaped bands across its back. The 2021 discoveries confirm that they live in alpine regions.

South Island robin 
The South Island robin (Petroica australis australis) can commonly be seen in Nelson Lakes National Park. They are a small bird that lives on a diet on insects with grey colouring and a white patch on their lower chest area. They are a very inquisitive species and often approach visitors to the national park getting within metres of them. Younger birds have been known to  stand on a person's boot. They live in the forest. They are often seen foraging on the ground. Their nests are at risk of predation from introduced mammalian species.

South Island kākā 
Large populations of kākā existed in the national park in the 1800s with "hundreds" living around Lake Rotoroa  by about 1900. The populations declined throughout the 20th century to the point that it was rare to see groups of more than five or six birds by 1991.

The South Island kākā (Nestor meridionalis meridionalis) was rarely seen in the park in 2009. They were most abundant around Lakes Rotoiti and Rotoroa and have benefited from the extensive stoat trapping which has been carried out by the Rotoiti Nature Recovery Project. Kaka are at risk from predation by stoats and possums.

Long-tailed bat 
The South Island long-tailed bat (Chalinolobus tuberculatus) were, in 1900, "a common sight" in the national park. A spot one kilometre to the east of St Arnaud was known as "bat cutting". They were observed to be declining in numbers by 1930 even though a colony of "more than a hundred bats" was observed. By the early 1990s, the species was classified as "rare" and numbers have declined further in the early 2000s in most valleys of the national park. They are still very occasionally seen by trampers.

Blue duck 
The blue duck or whio (Hymenolaimus malachorhynchos) was common in the Nelson Lakes regions in the 1800s with Julius von Haast noting in 1862 that  "It is found in all rivers, and is easily killed". During the Nelson Lakes National Park survey of 1978–1985 blue duck were only recorded in the Travers, Sabine, Glenroy and Matakitaki valleys with the Matakitaki valley being home to the greatest numbers. By 2009, there were too few birds, especially females remaining in Nelson Lakes National Park to ensure the continuation of the species without human help.

See also
National parks of New Zealand
Forest parks of New Zealand
Regional parks of New Zealand
Protected areas of New Zealand
Conservation in New Zealand

References

External links

 Nelson Lakes National Park at the Department of Conservation
 Friends of Rotoiti – volunteer pest control group
 New Zealand Mountain Safety Council's video on the Poukirikiri/Travers Saddle on the Travers-Sabine Circuit
 New Zealand Mountain Safety Council's video on Robert Ridge Route to Lake Angelus
 New Zealand Mountain Safety Council's video on Waiau Pass

National parks of New Zealand
Environment of the Tasman District
Protected areas established in 1956
Protected areas of the Tasman District